Ion Ivanov (born 21 January 1956) is a Romanian wrestler. He competed in the men's freestyle 90 kg at the 1980 Summer Olympics.

References

1956 births
Living people
Romanian male sport wrestlers
Olympic wrestlers of Romania
Wrestlers at the 1980 Summer Olympics
Place of birth missing (living people)